Estradiol cypionate/testosterone cypionate (EC/TC), sold under the brand names Depo-Testadiol and Femovirin among others, is an injectable combination medication of estradiol cypionate (EC), an estrogen, and testosterone cypionate (TC), an androgen/anabolic steroid, which is used in menopausal hormone therapy for women. It is specifically indicated for the treatment of moderate-to-severe vasomotor symptoms (i.e., hot flashes), but can also be used for other estrogen indications in women. The medication has also been used to suppress lactation in postpartum women.

Depo-Testadiol was provided in the form of 10 mL vials containing 2 mg/mL EC and 50 mg/mL TC in an oil solution and was administered by intramuscular injection once every 4 weeks. Conversely, Femovirin was provided in the form of 1 mL ampoules containing 3.5 mg/mL EC (2.4 mg/mL free estradiol) and 90 mg/mL TC (62.9 mg/mL free testosterone) in an oil solution and was administered by intramuscular injection once every 4 to 6 weeks. The elimination half-life of EC in oil by intramuscular injection is approximately 5 days, while the elimination half-life of TC in oil by intramuscular injection is approximately 8 days. EC/TP reportedly has a duration of about 21 days.

EC/TC likely poses a considerably increased risk of endometrial hyperplasia and cancer in women with intact uteruses (i.e., women who are not hysterectomized) if it is not combined with a progestogen. This is due to the EC component. The concomitant use of a progestogen will abolish such risks. The medication can also cause masculinization, such as acne, deepened voice, hirsutism, and increased sex drive, due to its TC component. Some of these masculinizing symptoms, such as voice deepening, can be irreversible.

Depo-Testadiol was introduced for medical use in 1954, while Femovirin was introduced for medical use in 1956. An oral tablet product with the same brand name of Femovirin, containing ethinylestradiol and methyltestosterone, was marketed in 1958, and should not be confused with the injectable Femovirin. Depo-Testadiol was discontinued in the United States by 2013. Both Depo-Testadiol and Femovirin have been discontinued in most other countries, but formulations of EC/TC under other brand names continue to be marketed in Taiwan.

See also
 List of combined sex-hormonal preparations

References

Combined estrogen–androgen formulations